A Family Christmas is the sixth extended play by American contemporary Christian music band We the Kingdom. The EP was released via Capitol Christian Music Group on October 22, 2021. The EP features guest appearances by Dante Bowe, Maverick City Music, and Chris Tomlin.

The EP was supported by the release of "Still Can’t Sleep On Christmas Eve" and "Silent Night (Heavenly Peace)" as singles.

The EP peaked at No. 44 on Billboard's Top Christian Albums chart in the United States. A Family Christmas received a GMA Dove Award nomination for Christmas / Special Event Album of the Year at the 2022 GMA Dove Awards.

Background
On October 20, 2021, We the Kingdom announced that A Family Christmas EP was slated for release on October 22. The EP contains six tracks, including guest appearances from Dante Bowe and Maverick City Music on the song "Silent Night (Heavenly Place)" and Chris Tomlin on the song "Christmas Day". The EP was recorded in Ed Cash's home studio in Franklin, Tennessee.

Release and promotion

Singles
"Still Can’t Sleep On Christmas Eve" and "Silent Night (Heavenly Peace)" were released to Christian radio in the United States as the lead singles from the EP.

Reception

Critical response

Joshua Andre in his 365 Days of Inspiring Media review wrote a favourable review of the extended play, saying: "With nothing much more needing to be said about We The Kingdom and their debut Christmas project; this release is especially moving and inspiring," further adding that "every track has no discernible weaknesses in any aspect."

Accolades

Track listing
All tracks were written by Ed Cash, Scott Cash, Franni Cash, Martin Cash, and Andrew Bergthold, except where stated.

Charts

Release history

References

External links
  on PraiseCharts

2021 EPs
2021 Christmas albums
We the Kingdom albums
Christmas EPs